Vouneuil-sur-Vienne (literally Vouneuil on Vienne) is a commune in the Vienne department in the Nouvelle-Aquitaine region in western France.

History
The Battle of Tours took place in 732 near the hamlet of Moussais (later renamed Moussais-la-Bataille), which is now part of the commune of Vouneuil-sur-Vienne.

Demographics

See also
Communes of the Vienne department

References

Communes of Vienne